Oriente, Italian and Spanish language for east, may refer to:

 Oriente, São Paulo, a city in the state of São Paulo, Brazil
 Oriente, San Juan, Puerto Rico, a barrio
 Oriente Province, a region of Cuba before 1976
 Oriente (comarca), Asturias, Spain
 Oriente (Ecuador), a region of eastern Ecuador
 Oriente (Lisbon Metro), Portugal, a train station
 , a former administrative division
 Universidad de Oriente, a Venezuelan university
 SS El Oriente, a cargo ship built in 1910 for the Morgan Line
 El Oriente, an expansion pack for Uncharted Waters Online

See also
 Gare do Oriente, a subway station or train from Lisbon, Portugal